Pearl Magic is a Ugandan television station owned by MultiChoice Uganda' DStv. The station was launched in October 2018 with its headquarters and studios at the MultiChoice Uganda headquarters in Kololo Kampala and only broadcasts through DStv and GOtv to audiences around Africa.

At its launch, Pearl Magic was branded as the television channel that would promote Ugandan culture from film, television and music, airing 100 percent of local Ugandan content. The station has since broadcast a number of syndicated  television series some of which had aired on other stations and others being first run syndicates. Such shows include; The Honourables, Mizigo Express, Sesiria, Loving Tyra, and others.

Sister channels

Pearl Magic Prime

Pearl Magic Prime is DStv's flagship channel for Uganda middle and upper bracket TV audiences. It is a 24-hour General Entertainment Channel targeted at Compact, Compact Plus and Premium Uganda pay TV audiences. The Channel showcases premium, authentic Ugandan local content.

With a context mix of telenovelas, reality, drama, comedy, Lifestyle, Music and Uganda movies, Pearl Magic Prime is the home to Ugandan Premium local content. Pearl Magic Prime is exclusively available on DSTV Channel 148 is truly Ugandan like never before.

TV series

References

Television stations in Uganda